Gaudineer Knob is a mountain summit on the Randolph/Pocahontas County line in eastern West Virginia, USA. The Gaudineer Knob Lookout Tower, an important US Forest Service (USFS) fire tower, formerly occupied the crown of the knob.

History
The knob had been a prominent, but unnamed, peak in a vast wilderness when in the late 1930s it was named in memory of Donald Gaudineer, one of the USFS's early rangers in the Monongahela National Forest (MNF). As a young forester, Gaudineer had been assigned to the Southern District of the recently established MNF. His headquarters at that time occupied the former Craig Lumber Company office at Thornwood. During his years as ranger for the Greenbrier District, Gaudineer oversaw reforestation projects, the building of roads to enhance wildfire protection, the erection of fire towers in his district, and various other routine forest management activities. In the mid-1930s Gaudineer was transferred to the Cheat Ranger District, at Parsons, and on April 27, 1936, he was killed while attempting to rescue his children from a house fire. The USFS selected the scenic peak east of Cheat Bridge (in his former ranger district) as a fitting memorial.

Gaudineer Knob Lookout Tower
Only the concrete footers remain from the fire tower that from 1936 through the 1970s surveyed the forest landscape surrounding Gaudineer Knob.

Gaudineer Scenic Area

The  Gaudineer Scenic Area is situated immediately north of Gaudineer Knob at about  elevation. It was established in 1964 and was declared a National Natural Landmark in 1974 owing to a  virgin red spruce stand that was spared the lumberman's saw when the surrounding countryside was clear-cut in the early 20th century.

References

Mountains of Randolph County, West Virginia
Mountains of Pocahontas County, West Virginia
Mountains of West Virginia
Allegheny Mountains
Monongahela National Forest